Renate Irmtraut Bartsch (born 12 December 1939) is a German philosopher of language. She was a professor at the University of Amsterdam between 1974 and 2004.

Career
Bartsch was born on 12 December 1939 in Königsberg. She earned her Doctor title at Heidelberg University in 1967 with a thesis titled: "Grundzüge einer empiristischen Bedeutungstheorie". Bartsch worked as professor of philosophy of language at the University of Amsterdam from 1974 until she retired in 2004.

Bartsch became a member of the Royal Netherlands Academy of Arts and Sciences in 2000.

References

1939 births
Living people
Heidelberg University alumni
Members of the Royal Netherlands Academy of Arts and Sciences
Writers from Königsberg
Philosophers of language
Academic staff of the University of Amsterdam
German expatriates in the Netherlands
Women linguists